Harpalyce or Harpalyke may refer to:

 Harpalyce (mythology), two characters in Greek mythology:
 Harpalyce, daughter of Clymenus
 Harpalyce, daughter of Harpalycus
 Harpalyce (plant), a genus in the family Fabaceae of flowering plants
 Harpalyce, a ship sunk by UB-4 during World War I
 Harpalyke (moon), a moon of Jupiter
 Delias harpalyce, an Australian butterfly in the family Pieridae